The National Student Exchange (NSE) is a member-based, not-for-profit consortium of accredited colleges and universities in the United States, Canada, Guam, Puerto Rico and the U.S. Virgin Islands that provides study away opportunities among its member institutions. Established in 1968, NSE has provided exchange opportunities to more than 100,000 students.

Student participation

The concept of study abroad or study away, in practice, is any experience that takes students outside of their comfort zones and challenges them to experience life from a different point of view. Rather than crossing oceans and continents, thinking globally begins for NSE students by crossing state, regional, provincial, and cultural borders to experience a change of people, place, and opportunity. 

Studying for a term or academic year at a member campus allows NSE students to take courses not available on their home campuses, expand their academic program options, acquire life skills, reside in a different region, be exposed to diverse cultural settings, seek out graduate and professional schools, and explore career options. NSE students gain insight into the historical and cultural makeup of different regions, improve their communications skills with individuals from different backgrounds, and prepare themselves to live and work in a culturally diverse society. 

NSE features a tuition reciprocity system that allows students to attend their host institution by paying either the in-state/in-province tuition of their host institution or the normal tuition of their home campus.

Famous Alumni
Viola Davis

Tony Shalhoub

Monica Quimby

College and university membership

NSE is a program that responds to institutional objectives for globalization, cultural diversity, and other off-campus learning initiatives. NSE invites applications for membership from colleges and universities that are: baccalaureate-granting institutions located in the United States, and its territories; institutions regionally accredited (United States); committed to providing the quality of service practiced by NSE members.

This description of the National Student Exchange was modified by NSE on March 19, 2013.

References

External links
http://www.nse.org/exchange/join.asp
http://www.nse.org/exchange/learn.asp    
http://www.nse.org/exchange/memcam.asp

Student exchange
1968 establishments in the United States
Educational institutions established in 1968